Locmalo is a commune in the Morbihan department of Brittany in north-western France. Inhabitants of Locmalo are called in French Locmalois.

Toponymy
From the Breton loc which means hermitage (cf.: Locminé) and 'malo' which derive from Saint Malo.

Map

Gallery

See also
Communes of the Morbihan department

References

External links

 Mayors of Morbihan Association 

Communes of Morbihan